Saint Maurice was an electoral district of the Legislative Assembly of the Parliament of the Province of Canada, in Canada East, on the north shore of the Saint Lawrence River, between Montreal and Quebec City. It was created for the first Parliament in 1841, and was based on the previous electoral district of the same name for the Legislative Assembly of Lower Canada.  It was represented by one member in the Legislative Assembly.

The electoral district lost some territory in the redistribution of 1853, when the district of Maskinongé was created, in part out of Saint Maurice.  The district was abolished in 1867 upon the creation of Canada and the province of Quebec.

Boundaries 

The electoral district of Saint Maurice roughly covered the current Mauricie region of Quebec, except for the city of Trois-Rivières.  The original boundaries were partially reduced in the 1853 redistribution, which created the new electoral district of Maskinongé from part of the Saint Maurice district.

The Union Act, 1840 had merged the two provinces of Upper Canada and Lower Canada into the Province of Canada, with a single Parliament.  The separate parliaments of Lower Canada and Upper Canada were abolished.  The Union Act provided that the pre-existing electoral boundaries of Lower Canada and Upper Canada would continue to be used in the new Parliament, unless altered by the Union Act itself.

The Saint Maurice electoral district of Lower Canada was not altered by the Act, and therefore continued with the same boundaries which had been set by a statute of Lower Canada in 1829:

Members for Saint-Maurice (1841-1867)

{| border="1" cellpadding="5" cellspacing="0" style="border-collapse: collapse border-color: #444444"
|- bgcolor="darkgray"
| 
|Name
|Party
|Election 

|Joseph-Édouard TurcotteModerate Reformer1841

|Joseph-Édouard Turcotte Moderate Reformer1842

|François Lesieur DesaulniersModerate Reformer1844

|Louis-Joseph PapineauRadical Reformer1848

|Joseph-Édouard TurcotteModerate Reformer1851

|Louis-Léon Lesieur DesaulniersParti bleu1854

|Louis-Léon Lesieur DesaulniersParti bleu1858

|Louis-Léon Lesieur DesaulniersParti bleu1861

|Charles Gérin-LajoieParti rouge1863
|}

Redistribution and abolition 

The Saint Maurice electoral district lost some of its original territory in the redistribution of seats in 1853, when the new electoral district of Maskinongé was created.

The district was abolished on July 1, 1867, when the British North America Act, 1867 came into force, splitting the Province of Canada into Quebec and Ontario.  It was succeeded by electoral districts of the same name in the House of Commons of Canada and the Legislative Assembly of Quebec.

References 

.

See also
List of elections in the Province of Canada
Mauricie

Electoral districts of Canada East